Bashir Haji Alias (born 1966) is a Member of the Senate of Malaysia for two terms beginning in 2017 and the second term ending in 2023 representing Labuan. Bashir is the Labuan Division United Malays National Organization Chief. He was appointed as the Chairman of the Labuan Corporation Advisory Council in 2016 to 2018 to replace the late Yunus Kurus. Then he was appointed again for the term 2020 to 2022 to replace Rozman Isli from the Heritage Party.

Election results

Honours
  :
  Member of the Order of the Defender of the Realm (AMN) (2007)
  :
  Companion Class II of the Exalted Order of Malacca (DPSM) - Datuk (2011)

References

People from Labuan
1966 births
People from Sabah
United Malays National Organisation politicians
Living people
Members of the Order of the Defender of the Realm